Alyaksandr Tsyarentsyew (born 4 September 1981) is a retired Belarusian professional footballer.

Career
Born in Minsk, Tsyarentsyew began playing football in FC BATE Borisov's youth system. He joined the senior team and made his Belarusian Premier League debut in 2000.

References

External links
 Tsyarentsyew's profile on FC Gorodeya on Russian language website

1981 births
Living people
Belarusian footballers
FC BATE Borisov players
FC Darida Minsk Raion players
FC Belshina Bobruisk players
FC Torpedo-BelAZ Zhodino players
FC Slavia Mozyr players
FC Gorodeya players
Association football midfielders